The 1957–1959 Currie Cup was the 27th edition of the Currie Cup, the premier domestic rugby union competition in South Africa. It was the first time in the tournament's history that the competition spanned multiple years.

See also

 Currie Cup

References

1957-1959
1957 in South African rugby union
Currie
1958 in South African rugby union
Currie
1959 in South African rugby union
Currie